Mordellistena schoutedeni is a species of beetle in the genus Mordellistena, and in the family Mordellidae. It was described by Píc in 1931.

References

Beetles described in 1931
schoutedeni